Leppävirta is a municipality of Finland. The municipality has a population of 
which 
is water. The population density is
.

The municipality is unilingually Finnish.

Geography 
Neighbour municipalities are Heinävesi, Joroinen, Kuopio, Pieksämäki, Suonenjoki, Tuusniemi and Varkaus.

Villages
 Sorsakoski
 Häikiä
 Häyry
 Lylymäki
 Niinimäki
 Oravikoski
 Reinikkala
 Saahkarlahti

Notable people
Jorma Hynninen, opera singer
, translator
Helena Kekkonen, peace activist
Mikko Kuustonen, singer-songwriter
Pentti Pekkarinen, politician
Jully Ramsay, historian and genealogist
Reino Soijärvi, ice hockey player
, writer
, writer, journalist and military aviator
, artisan
, sportsperson

International relations

Leppävirta is twinned with:

 Storfors in Sweden
 Dovre in Norway
 Schwerte in Germany
 Orissaare in Estonia

References
Notes

External links

 Municipality of Leppävirta – Official website

 
Populated places established in 1639
1639 establishments in Sweden